Neumair is a surname. Notable people with this surname include:

 Peter Neumair (b. 1950), German wrestler who competed in the 1972 and in the 1976 Summer Olympics 
 Gottlieb Neumair (b. 1939), German wrestler who competed at the 1960 Summer Olympics

Hebrew-language surnames
German-language surnames